Ernst van Heerden (20 March 1916 – 30 September 1997) was a leading Afrikaans poet.

Born in Pearston, Eastern Cape, South Africa, he was an openly gay academic famous for his poems on sport. He matriculated at Grey High School, Port Elizabeth.  In 1948 he received a silver medal in the Olympic Games International Poetry Competition for Ses gedigte/Six poems. He held the degrees of M.A. (University of Stellenbosch), D.Litt. et Phil.(Ghent), Hon.D.Litt. (Rhodes University), Hon D.Litt. (University of the Witwatersrand). He was an Emeritus Professor of Afrikaans and Nederlands at Wits. He also lectured at the University of Stellenbosch from 1943 to 1959. His hobby was the collection of South African works of art. He was the recipient of numerous awards, including the Hofmeyr prize for poetry in 1975.

References

External links
 profile

1916 births
Afrikaans-language poets
Afrikaans-language writers
Afrikaner people
South African LGBT poets
South African gay writers
Stellenbosch University alumni
Olympic silver medalists in art competitions
Hertzog Prize winners for poetry
Gay poets
20th-century South African poets
South African male poets
Medalists at the 1948 Summer Olympics
20th-century South African male writers
1997 deaths
Olympic competitors in art competitions
20th-century LGBT people